The  is a Japanese language proficiency test designed to objectively measure a person's practical communicative skills in communicating and responding to information on a Japanese-language business environment. Unlike its counterpart Japanese Language Proficiency Test (JLPT) which focuses more on general Japanese, BJT is not designed for measuring Japanese language knowledge nor business knowledge but instead, BJT is designed to measure a person’s practical communicative ability to utilize and respond to given information, ability to express thoughts and opinions, and at the same time promote ideas or projects to people of different backgrounds and expertise. 

The BJT is not only engineered to measure a person’s verbal communicative skills, but also the ability to understand and use Japanese with the aid of text, diagrams, photographs and any other available information in emails or faxes, etc. and at the same time to appropriately perform tasks and workloads suited to a Japanese-language business environment.

The Business Japanese Proficiency Test covers the full range of events or situations that may arise on a Japanese-language business environment.

History

The test was first offered in 1996 and was revised in 2003. It was originally administered by the Japan External Trade Organization (JETRO). In April 2009, however, oversight was transferred to the Japan Kanji Aptitude Testing Public Interest Foundation: the same organization that administers the Kanji kentei.

On August 18, 2010, it was announced that the test would "be discontinued at the end of the current fiscal year". However, on November 25, 2010, it was announced that the test would be "relaunched".

Examination and scoring
The Business Japanese Proficiency Test is split into three parts, Listening Comprehension, Listening and Reading Comprehension and Reading Comprehension.

Exam overview as stated on the official BJT website.

The test is scored out of a possible 800. The score is then ranked on a scale of 6 levels: J5, J4, J3, J2, J1, J1+, with J1+ being the highest and J5 the lowest.

*Level guideline as described on the BJT website

Testing locations 
Starting April 2017, the BJT is now being delivered as a computer based test via the Pearson Vue delivery system, a radical change from the industry standard paper based testing. 

As of 2018, the BJT is now available in more than 16 countries via the Pearson Vue testing network.

*Test center locations available on the Pearson Vue website

Notes

External links
 https://web.archive.org/web/20110709170430/http://www.jetro.go.jp/en/bjt/ The JETRO on the BJT (now points to the following link).
 https://web.archive.org/web/20081212115504/http://www.kentei.co.jp/bjt/ (Japanese)
 http://www.kanken.or.jp/bjt/english/index.html (English)

Japanese language tests